Ngando is a Bantu languages of the Central African Republic. 

Maho (2009) lists Ngando proper and the Kota (Dikota) dialect -- not to be confused with the Kota language (Gabon) (iKota) or the Kota language (India) (Kō mānt) -- as separate languages.

References

Ngondi-Ngiri languages